Petros Chrysochos (Greek: Πέτρος Χρυσοχός; born April 8, 1996) is a professional Cypriot tennis player and a member of Cyprus Davis Cup team.

He won his first professional ITF futures tournament in Sharm El Sheikh, Egypt without dropping a set which saw him debuting at 860 in the world on the professional ATP world rankings. Chrysochos was a member of the 2018 NCAA Men's Tennis Championship team at Wake Forest University, playing #2 in both the singles and doubles lineups. Chrysochos also won the 2018 NCAA Men's Tennis Singles Championship.

Chrysochos reached his highest combined ranking of 19 in the world on ITF junior circuit  and a career high ATP ranking of 354 achieved on 28 June 2021. Chrysochos has a career high doubles ranking of 448 achieved in September 2020.

Davis Cup
Chrysochos (Herodotou Tennis Academy) is a member of the Cyprus Davis Cup team, having posted a 25–10 record in singles and a 4–3 record in doubles in one tie played.

ATP Challenger and ITF Futures/World Tennis Tour finals

Singles (9–4)

Doubles (5–2)

References

External links

1996 births
Living people
Wake Forest Demon Deacons men's tennis players
People from Larnaca
Cypriot male tennis players
Tennis players at the 2014 Summer Youth Olympics